Sheykhabad-e Zangivand (also Romanized as Sheykhābād-e Zangīvand; also known as Sheykhābād, Shaikhābād, and Zangīvand) is a village in Firuzabad Rural District, Firuzabad District, Selseleh County, Lorestan Province, Iran. At the 2006 census, its population was 1,031, in 208 families.

References 

Towns and villages in Selseleh County